Alida Dóra Gazsó (born 18 April 2000) is a Hungarian sprint canoeist.

She won a medal at the 2019 ICF Canoe Sprint World Championships.

References

External links

2000 births
Living people
Hungarian female canoeists
ICF Canoe Sprint World Championships medalists in kayak
Canoeists from Budapest